Rajinder Kaur (10 February 1931 – 5 February 1989) was an Indian journalist and politician from Punjab, India.

Kaur was daughter of Master Tara Singh. She studied at Khalsa College, Amritsar and Punjab University, Chandigarh, and Camp College, New Delhi for M.A. in Philosophy, B.T. (Bachelor of Teaching) and Ph.D. in Philosophy. She was lecturer at Khalsa College, Amritsar in 1958–59. Later she entered journalism and politics. She edited Punjabi daily Parbhat and the monthly Sant Sipahi from Amritsar. She was president of the Istri Akali Dal, women's wing of the Shiromani Akali Dal. In April 1978 Rajinder Kaur was elected to the Rajya Sabha. She was shot dead by Khalistani terrorists at Bhatinda in February 1989.

References

1931 births
1989 deaths
Rajya Sabha members from Punjab, India
Punjabi-language writers
Journalists from Punjab, India
Women in Punjab, India politics
Shiromani Akali Dal politicians
People murdered in Punjab, India
Writers from Amritsar
Victims of the insurgency in Punjab
Victims of Sikh terrorism
20th-century Indian women politicians
20th-century Indian politicians
Indian women journalists
20th-century Indian journalists
20th-century Indian women writers
Women writers from Punjab, India
Politicians from Amritsar
Women members of the Rajya Sabha